Krasnopolye is a rural locality (a selo) in Nikolskoye 1-ye Rural Settlement, Vorobyovsky District, Voronezh Oblast, Russia. The population was 64 as of 2010. There are 10 streets.

Geography 
Krasnopolye is located 31 km east of Vorobyovka (the district's administrative centre) by road. 1-go otdeleniya sovkhoza Krasnopolsky is the nearest rural locality.

References 

Rural localities in Vorobyovsky District